David B. Williams is a freelance writer in Seattle. Originally raised in Seattle, he went to college in Colorado where he initially studied physics but switched to geology. He received a Bachelor of Arts in geology from Colorado College and worked as a park ranger at Arches National Park in Utah. Williams returned to Seattle to be a writer of natural history books and occasional urban geology tour guide. He was employed at Seattle's Burke Museum as of 2014. He writes a biweekly newsletter, Street Smart Naturalist: Notes on People, Place, and the PNW. One local bookseller wrote, "When it comes to books about Seattle and its surroundings, there's one must-read writer as far as I'm concerned, and that's David B. Williams." 

Williams' interest in urban geology was sparked by the use of stone in the Downtown Seattle Transit Tunnel.

Bibliography

 alternate title The Street-Smart Naturalist: Field Notes from Seattle
 (Washington State Book Award finalist)

 (funded by University of Washington Press Northwest Writers Fund grant)
 
David B. Williams (2021). Homewaters: A Human and Natural History of Puget Sound. University of Washington Press. ISBN 9780295748603.

References

Sources

Further reading

External links
http://geologywriter.com

Writers from Seattle
American geologists
Year of birth missing (living people)
Living people